Nodaway Township is one of ten townships in Andrew County, Missouri, United States. As of the 2010 census, its population was 6,738.

Nodaway Township was established in 1846, and named after the Nodaway River.

Geography
It contains four cemeteries: Bennett Lane, Coffman, Earls and Kellogg.

The streams of Honey Creek and Lincoln Creek run through this township.

Transportation
Nodaway Township contains one airport, Worth Airport.

References

 USGS Geographic Names Information System (GNIS)

External links
 US-Counties.com
 City-Data.com

Townships in Andrew County, Missouri
Townships in Missouri